Bryant may refer to:

Organizations 
 Bryant Bank, a bank in Alabama, United States
 Bryant Electric Company, an American manufacturer of electrical components
 Bryant Homes, a British house builder, part of Taylor Woodrow
 Bryant University (formerly Bryant College), a four-year college in Smithfield, Rhode Island
 Bryant & Stratton College, a proprietary college in the United States

People 
 Bryant (surname)
 Bryant Dunston (born 1986), American-Armenian basketball player
 Bryant Koback (born 1998), American football player
 Bryant Mix (born 1972), American football player
 Bryant McKinnie (born 1979), American football player
 Bryant McFadden (born 1981), American football player
 Bryant Myers (born 1998), Puerto Rican reggaeton singer
 Bryant Reeves (born 1973), American basketball player

Places 
 Bryant, Saskatchewan, Canada
 Bryant Range, in the South Island of New Zealand

United States
 Bryant, Alabama
 Bryant, Arkansas
 Bryant, Illinois
 Bryant, Indiana
 Bryant, Iowa
 Bryant, Michigan
 Bryant, Minneapolis, Minnesota
 Bryant, Missouri
 Bryant, South Dakota
 Bryant, Seattle, Washington
 Bryant, Wisconsin
 Bryant Park, at the intersection of 42nd Street and Sixth Avenue, New York City
 Bryant Township (disambiguation)

See also 
 Briant (disambiguation)
 Bryan (disambiguation)
 Senator Bryant (disambiguation)